Mycetophilinae is a subfamily of fungus gnats in the family Mycetophilidae. There are more than 30 genera and 2,000 described species in Mycetophilinae. There are two tribes, Exechiini and Mycetophilini.

Genera
These 34 genera belong to the subfamily Mycetophilinae:

Acadia
Acnemia
Acomoptera
Acomopterella
Acrodicrania
Adicroneura
Aglaomyia Vockeroth, 1980
Allactoneura
Allocotocera
Allodia Winnertz, 1863
Allodiopsis Tuomikoski, 1966
Anaclileia
Anatella Winnertz, 1863
Aneura
Anomalomyia
Apolephthisa
Arachnocampa
Asindulum
Aspidionia Colless, 1966
Ateleia
Austrosciophila
Austrosynapha
Azana
Baeopterogyna
Boletina
Brachypeza Winnertz, 1863
Brevicornu Marshall, 1896
Caladonileia
Cawthronia
Cerotelion
Clastobasis
Coelophthinia
Coelosia
Cordyla Meigen, 1803
Creagdhubhia
Cycloneura
Diadocidia
Ditomyia
Docosia
Drepanocercus
Dynatosoma Winnertz, 1863
Dziedzickia
Ectrepesthoneura
Epicypta Winnertz, 1863
Euceroplatus
Eudicrana
Exechia Winnertz, 1863
Exechiopsis Tuomikoski, 1966
Fenderomyia
Garrettella
Gnoriste
Gracilileia
Greenomyia
Grzegorzekia
Hadroneura
Hesperodes
Heteropterna
Impleta
Indoleia
Keroplatus
Leia
Leptomorphus
Loicia
Lygistorrhina
Macrobrachius Dziedzicki, 1889
Macrocera
Macrorrhyncha
Manota
Megalopelma
Megophthalmidia
Micromacrocera
Monoclona
Morganiella
Mycetophila Meigen, 1803
Mycomya
Myrosia Tuomikoski, 1966
Neoallocotocera
Neoaphelomera
Neoclastobasis
Neoempheria
Neotrizygia
Neuratelia
Notolopha Tuomikoski, 1966
Novakia
Orfelia
Palaeodocosia
Paleoplatyura
Paracycloneura
Paraleia
Paramorganiella
Paratinia
Paratrizygia
Parvicellula
Phoenikiella
Phronia Winnertz, 1863
Phthinia
Platurocypta Enderlein, 1910
Platyura
Polylepta
Pseudalysiina
Pseudexechia Tuomikoski, 1966
Pseudobrachypeza Tuomikoski, 1966
Pseudorymosia
Rondaniella
Rymosia Winnertz, 1863
Saigusaia
Sceptonia Winnertz, 1863
Sciophila
Sigmoleia
Speolepta
Stenophragma
Sticholeia
Stigmatomeria Tuomikoski, 1966
Symmerus
Synapha
Synplasta Skuse, 1890
Syntemna
Tarnania Tuomikoski, 1966
Tasmanina
Taxicnemis
Tetragoneura
Trichonta Winnertz, 1863
Trichoterga
Trizygia
Xenoplatyura
Zygomyia Winnertz, 1863
Zygophronia Edwards, 1928

References

Further reading

External links

Nematocera